Interleukin-1 receptor-associated kinase-like 2 is an enzyme that in humans is encoded by the IRAK2 gene.

Function 

IRAK2 encodes the interleukin-1 receptor-associated kinase 2, one of two putative serine/threonine kinases that become associated with the interleukin-1 receptor (IL1R) upon stimulation. IRAK2 is reported to participate in the IL1-induced upregulation of NF-kappaB.

Interactions 

IRAK2 has been shown to interact with TRAF6 and Myd88.

References

Further reading 

 
 
 
 
 
 
 
 
 

EC 2.7.11